Frederick John King (11 June 1923 – 30 August 2016) was a Canadian politician. He was a Progressive Conservative Party member of the House of Commons of Canada. He was a farmer, orchardist, and public servant by career.

King was born in Kaleden, British Columbia where he attended public school, then graduated to secondary school in Penticton. He was first elected to national politics at the Okanagan—Similkameen electoral district in the 1979 federal election. He was re-elected there in the 1980 and 1984 federal elections. In the 1988 federal election, when the riding became Okanagan—Similkameen—Merritt, King lost to Jack Whittaker of the New Democratic Party and did not campaign in any further federal elections. He died on 30 August 2016 in Penticton, British Columbia.

References

External links
 

1923 births
2016 deaths
Members of the House of Commons of Canada from British Columbia
People from the Regional District of Okanagan-Similkameen
Progressive Conservative Party of Canada MPs
Canadian orchardists